Fakahau Valu (born June 6, 1949) is a former n rugby union player. He played as a flanker.

Career
He made his debut against the Māori All Blacks in 1973. Valu captained  at the 1987 Rugby World Cup, he played his last game against . He was a member of the n squad that handed  a shocking 16–11 defeat on June 30, 1973 at Ballymore Stadium. 

He coached  at the 1995 Rugby World Cup.

After career
In 2009, Valu was inducted into IRB's Pathway of Fame. 
In 2008, Valu was awarded with the Order of Queen Sālote Tupou III and a year later, he was inducted to the Tongan National Sports Hall of Fame along with Kitione Lave, Paea Wolfgram, Taufa'ahau Tupou IV, Tali Kavapalu and Motuliki Kailahi. Valu is also a member of the organising committee for the 2019 Pacific Games.

Personal life
His son, Asaeli Ai Valu is also a rugby union player, who represents Japan at international level.

Honours
National honours
  Order of Queen Sālote Tupou III, Commander (31 July 2008).

References

External links

1950 births
Living people
Tonga international rugby union players
Tongan rugby union coaches
Tongan rugby union players
Knight Commanders of the Order of Queen Sālote Tupou III
Tonga national rugby union team coaches
Rugby union flankers